The bowling events at the 2005 World Games in Duisburg was played between 15 and 20 July. 64 competitors, from 29 nations, participated in the tournament. The bowling competition took place at RRZ / Bowling Center, where ten-pin events were held and in Sporthalle Krefelder Straße, where nine-pin events were held.

Participating nations

Medal table

Events

References

External links
 Bowling on IWGA website
 Results

 
2005 World Games
2005